2003 Denmark Open is a darts tournament, which took place in Denmark in 2003.

Results

References

2003 in darts
2003 in Danish sport
Darts in Denmark